Kotsur (Cyrillic: Коцур) is a surname. It is a cognate of Kocur (Polish, Slovak) and Kocour (Czech). Kotsur may refer to:
 Andrei Kotsur (born 1982), Belarusian kickboxer
 Pavel Kotsur (born 1974), Kazakhstani chess grandmaster
 Svyryd Kotsur (1890–1920), Ukrainian insurgent during the War of Independence
 Troy Kotsur (born 1968), American actor

See also
 
 Kocur

East Slavic-language surnames